Mikheil Potskhveria (born 12 August 1975) is a Georgian former professional footballer who played as a forward.

References 

1975 births
Living people
People from Novosibirsk Oblast
Sportspeople from Novosibirsk Oblast
Russian sportspeople of Georgian descent
Soviet footballers
Footballers from Georgia (country)
Association football forwards
Russian Premier League players
Ukrainian Premier League players
Georgia (country) international footballers
FC Zorya Luhansk players
FC Metalurh Zaporizhzhia players
FC Shakhtar Donetsk players
FC Dnipro players
FC Spartak Vladikavkaz players
SV Werder Bremen II players
FC Rostov players
Expatriate footballers from Georgia (country)
Expatriate sportspeople from Georgia (country) in Ukraine
Expatriate footballers in Ukraine
Expatriate sportspeople from Georgia (country) in Germany
Expatriate footballers in Germany
Expatriate sportspeople from Georgia (country) in Russia
Expatriate footballers in Russia